Khlebnikovo is the name of several rural localities in Russia:
Khlebnikovo, Mari El Republic, a selo in Mari-Tureksky District of the Mari El Republic
Khlebnikovo, Tambov Oblast, a selo in Sosnovsky District of Tambov Oblast
Khlebnikovo, Vologda Oblast, a village in Gryazovetsky District of Vologda Oblast